Tapan is a village and municipality in the Dashkasan Rayon of Azerbaijan.  It has a population of 758.  The municipality consists of the villages of Tapan, Dəvrallı, and Güneykənd.

References 

Populated places in Dashkasan District